Myrtillin is an anthocyanin. It is the 3-glucoside of delphinidin. It can be found in all green plants, most abundantly in blackcurrant, blueberry, huckleberry, bilberry leaves and in various myrtles, roselle plants, and Centella asiatica plant. It is also present in yeast and oatmeal. The sumac fruit's pericarp owes its dark red colour to anthocyanin pigments, of which chrysanthemin, myrtillin and delphinidin have yet been identified.

The various colors, such as red, mauve, purple, violet, and blue in Hydrangea macrophylla are developed from myrtillin complexes with metal ions called metalloanthocyanins.

Metabolism 
The enzyme [[anthocyanin 3-O-glucoside 6-O-hydroxycinnamoyltransferase]] produces delphinidin 3-(6-p-coumaroyl)glucoside from myrtillin and p''-coumaroyl-CoA in the anthocyanin biosynthesis pathway.

References 

Anthocyanidins
Flavonoid glucosides